The Deutsche Einheit Fernstraßenplanungs- und -bau GmbH (DEGES) (German Unity motorway planning and construction company) is a state-owned project management institution founded on October 7, 1991, about one year after the German reunification. The intention was to support the New Länder in the planning and preparation of necessary construction work on their old and new Autobahn highways.

Organisation 

Participators and owners of DEGES are the Federal Republic of Germany (42,91%) as well as the federal states Brandenburg, Hamburg, Mecklenburg-Vorpommern, Saxony, Saxony-Anhalt, Schleswig-Holstein and Thuringia with 8,16% each. The company resides in Berlin, there are branches in every capital of the participating federal states. As of 2006, the company employs approximately 250 people.

Order size 

The company is responsible for the improvement or construction of 1200 km of Autobahn (750 km old, 450 km new) in the New Länder, as well as the City-Tunnel in Leipzig, with a total investment of approximately 9.6 billion €,

External links 
 www.deges.de DEGES GmbH Official website

Streetworks
Government-owned companies of Germany